KYTE or Kyte may refer to:

Places
Kyte, Norway
Kyte River, Illinois, United States

Radio stations
KYTE, a radio station (102.7 FM) licensed to Independence, Oregon, U.S.
KUFO, a radio station (970 AM) licensed to Portland, Oregon, U.S., known as KYTE 1977–1990
KXL-FM, a radio station (101.1 FM) licensed to Portland, Oregon, U.S., known as KYTE-FM 1977–1979, 1985–1989

Other uses
Kyte (band), an electronic indie pop group
Kyte (surname), including a list of people with the name

See also

Kite